Benns Church is a census-designated place (CDP) in Isle of Wight County, Virginia, United States. It is located at the junction of U.S. Route 258 and State Routes 10 and 32, southeast of Smithfield. The population as of the 2010 census was 872.

The community is named for Benn's United Methodist Church, which lies at the intersection of Benn's Church Boulevard and Brewer's Neck Boulevard (US-258 with State Routes 10 and 32). The church was founded at that location by George Benn in 1789. Benn is buried in front of the church. The church bears a Virginia Historical Marker.

Benns Church is home to Benn's Grant, a  mixed-use development, which took almost a decade to be realized.

Geography
Benns Church is bordered to the north by the town of Smithfield and to the east by Carrollton.

The community drains westward to Cypress Creek, north to Jones Creek, and southeast to Brewers Creek, all of which become tidal inlets of the James River system.

References

Census-designated places in Isle of Wight County, Virginia
Unincorporated communities in Virginia
Census-designated places in Virginia
1789 establishments in Virginia